Central ossifying fibroma is a benign neoplasm that may arise from the fibroblasts of the periodontal ligaments.  It is more likely to affect women in their third and fourth decades.  Central ossifying fibromas are more common in the mandible around premolars and molars.

References

 Kahn, Michael A. Basic Oral and Maxillofacial Pathology. Volume 1. 2001.

Pathology of the maxilla and mandible